"Elluvochi Godaramma" is an Indian Telugu-language song from the film Gaddalakonda Ganesh. The song was a remake of the original "Yeluvachhi" from the film Devatha originally composed by K. Chakravarty. It is recreated by Mickey J. Meyer in the voice of S. P. Balasubrahmanyam and P. Susheela. The song features Varun Tej and Pooja Hegde. The song's lyrical version was released on 18 September 2019, while the full video song was released on 1 November 2019 under the music label Saregama. The single is filmed at Safilguda Lake.

Release 
The teaser of the song was released on 17 September. The lyrical was released on 18 September 2019 and the full video was released on 1 November 2019.

Music video 
The music video features Varun Tej and Pooja Hegde dancing for the single. The music is choreographed by Sekhar.

Success and impact 
The song had approximately 10 million views on YouTube within 10 days of release, which helped in the marketing of the film. Various versions of the song were uploaded by amateur singers, guitarists and DJs on social networking sites. Gaddalakonda Ganesh had less than 3 weeks for the promotion, unlike other Telugu movies which indulge in months of promotion. The music video on YouTube has garnered 510 million views as in December 2021.

Music credits 
Credits adapted from Saregama.

 K. Chakravarthy – composer
 Mickey J. Meyer – remix, programmer, arranger, keyboard
 S. P. Balasubrahmanyam – vocals
 P. Susheela – vocals
 Ramya Behara – chorus
 Mohana Bhogaraju – chorus
 Veturi – lyrics
 Darren Vermaas – mixing, mastering [at New Edge (Mumbai and New York)]
 Charles Berthoud – bass guitars
 Sandilya Pisapati – violin
 Santhosh – rhythms
 Shantanoo – recording engineer
 Abhishek – recording engineer, assistance mixing, assistance mastering
 Seenu – studio assistance
 Lingam – studio assistance

References

External links

2019 songs
Telugu film songs
Indian songs